101 Chodyangal is a 2013 Indian Malayalam-language film written and directed by Sidhartha Siva. At the 60th National Film Awards the film won the awards for Best Debut Film of a Director and Best Child Artist for Minon. It also won the Silver Crow Pheasant Award for Best Feature Film (Audience Prize) at the 18th International Film Festival of Kerala.

The film is set in Kaviyoor, Tiruvalla, director's hometown in Kerala, which inspired the film. The story revolves around a school assignment given to a class V student to frame 101 questions.

The film is slated to release in theatres in April 2013.

Plot
A Class V student is given an assignment to frame 101 questions. The film is about the efforts he has to put in to frame those questions. At this point, his father, who is a factory employee, loses his job. The two parallel streams converge at the end.

Cast
 Indrajith Sukumaran as Mukundan
 Minon as Anilkumar Bokaro
 Lena as Sati
 Nishanth Sagar as Radhakrishnan
 Sudheesh as Vijayan
 Baby Diya as Anagha
 Rachana Narayanankutty as Deepa
 Murugan as Sivanandan
 Manikandan Pattambi

References

External links

Indian children's films
2013 films
2010s Malayalam-language films
Films shot in Kerala
Thiruvalla
Films set in Kerala
Best Debut Feature Film of a Director National Film Award winners
2013 directorial debut films
2010s children's films
Films directed by Sidhartha Siva